William H. Boyd (December 18, 1886 in New York City, New York – March 20, 1935 in Los Angeles, California) was an American actor billed as William "Stage" Boyd or William Stage Boyd.

Biography
Boyd was an early 20th century stage actor who appeared in two Broadway plays and then worked in motion pictures. To avoid confusion with the better-known performer working under the same name, William Boyd (best known for playing Hopalong Cassidy), Boyd adopted the name William "Stage" Boyd to emphasize his experience on the legitimate stage. Such experience was considered an advantage to an actor after the introduction of talking pictures.

Boyd's arrests for alcohol possession (during Prohibition) and drug possession damaged his career and that of the other William Boyd. Many newspapers reported the arrests, but published photos of the wrong William Boyd, who lost his studio contract with RKO.

Boyd's first wife, Margaret Christiansen, later married theatrical producer Harry Frazee, the one-time owner of the Boston Red Sox who is best remembered for selling Babe Ruth to the New York Yankees.

Filmography

References

External links 
 
 
 

1880s births
1935 deaths
American male stage actors
American male film actors
Male actors from New York City
20th-century American male actors